Eubucco is a genus of colourful birds in the family Capitonidae. They are found in humid forest in South and Central America, and the species have almost entirely allo- or parapatric distributions. Slightly smaller than the members of the genus Capito, members of the genus Eubucco are all sexually dimorphic, have stubby yellowish bills, green backs, yellow to the neck or underparts, and, at least in the males, red to the head. Typically seen singly or in pairs, they are primarily frugivorous, but also take arthropods.

Species

References
 Schulenberg, T., D. Stotz, D. Lane, J. O'Neill, & T. Parker III. (2007). Birds of Peru. Christopher Helm Publishers.

External links
 

 
Bird genera
Taxa named by Charles Lucien Bonaparte
Taxonomy articles created by Polbot